Weston Patrick is a small village and civil parish in Hampshire. Weston Patrick is divided from the neighbouring parish of Weston Corbett by the road leading to the village of Upton Grey.

The former BBC Gardener's World presenter Monty Don grew up in the village.

Manor
The manor of Weston Patrick, which probably derives its name from its 13th-century owner, 'Patrick de Chaworth', was held of the king in chief by the service of suit at the Odiham Hundred. It is not mentioned in the Domesday Survey, and was then probably included in the extensive manor of Odiham. The first known owner of the manor was William Briwere, and it was probably granted to him by King Richard I or King John, with both of whom he was in great favour. The manor passed from William in the same way as King's Somborne and became part of the Duchy of Lancaster. It remained in the Crown until 1546–47, when it was granted by Henry VIII to Lawrence Herward.

Humbly Grove Oil Field and Gas Storage

The Humbly Grove oil field, north and east of the airfield, was discovered in 1980 and production began in 1984, with up to 1000 barrels a day of crude oil being piped to the terminal at Holybourne, near Alton. In 1995 the oil field was developed into an underground gas storage facility, with a gas pipeline linking it to the national gas grid at Barton Stacey. The replenished gas cap on the oil field increased the pressure on the remaining oil, boosting production and increasing the lifetime of the extraction.

See also
 The Hundred of Odiham

References

Further reading
 Hugh Bedford and David Don Weston Patrick and Weston Corbett: The Story of Two Villages 2009 (available from St. Lawrence Church)

External links
 Weston Patrick - British History Online
 Basingstoke and Deane - Weston Patrick and Weston Corbett

Villages in Hampshire
Civil parishes in Basingstoke and Deane